At War as at War is a 1969 Soviet war film directed by Viktor Tregubovich. The film had 20 million  theatre admissions.

Plot
By freeing Right-Bank Ukraine (west of the Dnieper River) from the German invaders, the fresh junior lieutenant  of self-propelled, weaponized military vehicle earns respect of his subordinates.  It had the hit song “The Tanks Rumbled Across the Field” — one of the most widely recognized and established war song.

Cast 
 Mikhail Kononov as Alexander Alexandrovich Maleshkin
 Oleg Borisov as Mikhail Domeshek  
 Victor Pavlov as Grigory Shcherbak  
 Fyodor Odinokov as Osip Byankin
 Boris Tabarovsky as Bezzubtsev
 Mikhail Gluzsky as Col. Day
 Pyotr Lyubeshkin as Timofei Vasilievich Ovsyannikov
 Valentin Zubkov as Col. Basov
 Boris Arakelov as Chegnichka
 German Kolushkin as Pavel Telenkov  
 Pyotr Gorin as Sergachyov
 Boris Sichkin as Selivanov
 Yuriy Dubrovin as soldier Gromykhalo

See also 
 Soviet Tankmen's Song

References

External links 

At War as at War at KinoPoisk

1969 war films
Soviet war films
1960s Russian-language films
Lenfilm films
Soviet World War II films